Meet Me Tonight is a 1952 omnibus British comedy film adapted from three one act plays by Noël Coward: Red Peppers, Fumed Oak and Ways and Means; which are part of his Tonight at 8.30 play cycle. The film was released as Tonight at 8:30 in the U.S. It was directed by Anthony Pelissier and starred Valerie Hobson, Nigel Patrick, Stanley Holloway, Ted Ray and Jack Warner.

It earned billings of £97,000.

Plot
In "The Red Peppers", a husband and wife song and dance team (Kay Walsh, Ted Ray) bicker with each other, another performer (Martita Hunt), and the theatre manager (Frank Pettingell). In "Fumed Oak", a middle-aged man (Stanley Holloway) finally has enough of his wife, daughter, and mother-in-law (Betty Ann Davies, Dorothy Gordon, and Mary Merrall respectively). Having saved enough money secretly, he announces to his stunned family that he is leaving, never to see them again. In the final segment, "Ways and Means", a husband (Nigel Patrick) and his wife (Valerie Hobson) wonder what they will do now that he has gambled away their money, leaving little to pay their debts, especially to Olive (Jessie Royce Landis). They pawn their last few valuable possessions, hoping to win enough in the casino. However, Olive takes the seat the husband was waiting for and proceeds to win a great deal of money. When she gets up, he takes his rightful place and loses all he has. That night, the couple awake to find Olive's chauffeur, Murdoch (Jack Warner), trying to steal from them. After laughing at him (since they have nothing worth the effort), the wife proposes he rob from his employer and split the money with them. Murdoch takes Olive's winnings, but double crosses the couple, only to end up caught by the police.

Cast

Lily Pepper - 	Kay Walsh
George Pepper - 	Ted Ray
Mabel Grace - 	Martita Hunt
Mr. Edwards - 	Frank Pettingell
Bert Bentley - 	Bill Fraser
Stage Manager - 	Toke Townley
Call-Boy - 	Ian Wilson
Performing Dog Act - 	Frank's Fox Terriers
Chinese Jugglers - 	The Young China Troupe
Henry Gow - 	Stanley Holloway
Doris Gow - 	Betty Ann Davies
Mrs. Rocket (Grandma) - 	Mary Merrall
Elsie - 	Dorothy Gordon
Stella Cartwright - 	Valerie Hobson
Toby Cartwright - 	Nigel Patrick
Murdoch - 	Jack Warner
Olive - 	Jessie Royce Landis
Chaps - 	Michael Trubshawe
Nanny - 	Mary Jerrold
Elena - 	Yvonne Furneaux
The Fence - 	 Jacques Cey

Critical reception
The New York Times wrote, "Tonight at 8:30 is, in short, a varied entertainment, short on excitement but funny and trenchant enough for many tastes."

References

External links

1952 films
1952 comedy films
British anthology films
British films based on plays
Films shot at Pinewood Studios
Films directed by Anthony Pelissier
British comedy films
Films produced by Anthony Havelock-Allan
1950s English-language films
1950s British films